The Challenge Provincia di Varese was a golf tournament on the Challenge Tour that is played at the Golf Club Varese in Luvinate, Italy. It was played for the first and only time in 2012.

Winners

References

External links
Coverage on the Challenge Tour's official site

Former Challenge Tour events
Golf tournaments in Italy